KRQQ (93.7 FM) is a radio station in Tucson, Arizona. Its transmitter is on Tucson Mountain. Known as 93.7 KRQ, the station plays top 40 (CHR) music, and its primary audience or demographic is teens and young adults. Its studios are located north of downtown Tucson along Oracle Road. It's also the most popular radio station in the Tucson area.

History
KRQQ began its life in 1971 as KXEW-FM, a Spanish station which also aired some bilingual programming especially in the evenings. It was purchased by Grabet, Inc. Radio Enterprises in 1977; the new owners made it a top 40 station, under the name of "The New 94 KRQ", and changed the call letters as KRQQ.  The station was sold to Nationwide Communications in the 1980s.

According to radio industry trade publication Radio & Records, during the late 1980s, KRQQ was the highest-rated Top 40 station in the United States under their program director and KZZP alum himself Clarke Ingram, with a 23 percent share of the total audience.

Nationwide later sold its Tucson stations to Tucson Radio Partners, which in turn was absorbed by Prism Radio and then iHeartMedia in the 1990s. The radio station is currently one of the best rated Top 40 stations in Arizona.

The station's slogan in the 1980's was "Tucson's Only Hit Music Station!"

Programs

Morning personalities include the Phoenix-based Johnjay & Rich and Nick Wize from 10am to 3pm MST. The weekday personalities are Yaya Martinez from 3 to 7pm and Letty B from 7pm to midnight. The overnight personality is Kayla from midnight to 5am. A variety of iHeartRadio personalities are voicetracked during the weekend. Syndicated weekend programs include AT40 with Ryan Seacrest, Most Requested Live, the iHeartRadio Countdown, and On The Move with Enrique Santos.

Music
Music on the station stays within the CHR genre. However, their playlist moves with the audience. During the daytime, the playlist consists of mostly mainstream CHR songs, Hot AC, and strong golds, being light on urban and rhythmic. During the late afternoon, evening, and overnight hours, the playlist is much heavier on urban and rhythmic tracks, with mainstream songs mixed in.

KRQ also includes a very strong 'gold' and 'recurrent' tracks mixed in the playlist, mostly during the daytime.

See also
List of radio stations in Arizona

References

External links
Station website
Live streaming audio from KRQ

Contemporary hit radio stations in the United States
Nationwide Communications
Radio stations established in 1987
RQQ
IHeartMedia radio stations